Major-General Jacob Morton (1761–1836) was an American military officer, lawyer, and businessman.

Biography
Morton was born in New York City on July 8, 1761. He studied law at The College of New Jersey, the predecessor of Princeton University; however, Morton never practiced law.

Morton was the marshal for the First inauguration of George Washington. When it was found that no bible was available, Morton retrieved the Lodge Bible from St. John's Lodge where he was the Worshipful Master.

Morton served as New York City Comptroller from 1807 to 1808. Morton was also later clerk for the New York City Common Council.

Morton was an active Freemason, and was the Grand Master of Grand Lodge of New York from 1801–04. The Grand Lodge of New York established an award named for Morton, known as the "Jacob Morton Award", given to Masons or Masonic Organizations that have demonstrated exceptional voluntary service to their community. In 1796, Jacob Morton was listed as the presiding officer of Ancient Encampment, Knights Templar (New York City), in its first published list of officers. He remained in that office until 1810, when all traces of the encampment were lost. In 1815, the Grand Encampment of Knights Templar of New York was created. On August 16, 1823, the Grand Encampment issued a warrant to Morton Encampment No. 4 (now Morton Commandery No. 4), which was named in honor of General Morton.

Morton was promoted to brigadier-general in 1804. The Brigade he commanded was known as "Morton's Brigade of Artillery," which was the precursor for the Seventh Regiment of New York.

As Major-General, Morton led the New York Militia during the War of 1812.

He died in New York City on December 3, 1836.

Notes

References

1761 births
1836 deaths
Princeton University alumni
New York City Comptrollers
Masonic Grand Masters
American militiamen in the War of 1812
New York City Council members
American militia generals
People of the Province of New York